The Ljubljana University Medical Centre (abb. UKC Ljubljana) or Ljubljana UMC is the largest hospital centre in Slovenia based in Ljubljana. It was officially opened on 29 November 1975 and  has over 2,100 beds and over 8,300 employees, making it one of the largest hospital centres in Central Europe.

It is the main training base for the University of Ljubljana Faculty of Health Sciences and the Faculty of Medicine, which is housed nearby. The Ljubljana University Medical Centre had previously been led by Janez Poklukar, who has since become the Minister of Health.

History

 1966: Start of construction works on the central building. The construction, which started on 13 July, was led by Slovenian architect  according to the plans by Medico Engineering.
 1975: Ceremonial opening of the Ljubljana UMC. The total price of the construction equaled 617 million Yugoslav dinars in 1975, which was recalculated to 617 million euro in 2020.
 1980: The long-time president of the SFR Yugoslavia, Josip Broz Tito, dies of gangrene-induced infection in this hospital.
 2006: Ljubljana Medical Centre renames itself into Ljubljana University Medical Centre, emphasising the collaboration of experts of different specialties and its role as a teaching hospital of the nearby medical faculty.
 2010: The first ever robotic-assisted operation at the femoral vasculature is performed at the Department of Cardiovascular Surgery.
2016: Discovery of the first scientific evidence that the Zika virus infects the foetus brain through the infected mother and can cause permanent brain damage and microcephaly.
2018: Total nose reconstruction in two stages using only the patient's tissue; the nose was reconstructed on the forearm using a 3D model, following which the nose was placed on the face.
2018: Both lungs of a patient simultaneously transplanted for the first time.
2018: First auditory brainstem implant.

See also
 List of hospitals in Slovenia

References

External links

 Official website

Hospital buildings completed in 1975
Hospitals in Slovenia
Medical education in Slovenia
Teaching hospitals
Medical Centre
Hospitals established in 1975
Medical and health organizations based in Slovenia
Medical Centre
Medical Centre
20th-century architecture in Slovenia